The African Race Walking Championships was a quadrennial race walking competition for athletes representing countries from Africa, organized by the Confederation of African Athletics (CAA).  It was established in 1999 and has featured races for senior men (20 km) and women (10 km in 1999, 20 km from 2005 on).  The 2005 edition was held jointly with the African Combined Events Championships.  The 2009 edition also featured junior events (10 km men and women).  The 2013 men's event was part of the IAAF World Race Walking Challenge.

Editions

Results 
Results were compiled from the Athletics Weekly, the Confederation of African Athletics, the IAAF, and the Fédération Suisse de Marche.

Men's results

20 kilometres

10 kilometres (Junior)

Women's results

10 kilometres

20 kilometres

10 kilometres (Junior)

See also
IAAF World Race Walking Cup
European Race Walking Cup
Pan American Race Walking Cup
South American Race Walking Championships
Asian Race Walking Championships
Oceania Race Walking Championships
Central American Race Walking Championships

References

Continental athletics championships
Racewalking competitions
Recurring sporting events established in 1999
Recurring sporting events disestablished in 2015
Racewalking
Biennial athletics competitions
Defunct athletics competitions